Saint-Georges-sur-Cher (literally Saint-Georges on Cher) is a commune in the Loir-et-Cher department of central France.

Population

See also
Communes of the Loir-et-Cher department

References

External links
Official website

Communes of Loir-et-Cher